The Men's 4 x 400 metres relay race at the 2013 European Athletics Indoor Championships was held on March 3, 2013 at 18:45 local time.

Records

Results

The final was held at 18:45.

Controversy
Originally, the British men's 4 × 400 m quartet of Michael Bingham, Richard Buck, Levine and Richard Strachan finished the race first, followed by Russian and Polish Team, but their victory was questioned by the judges because during his change, Richard Buck had crossed the line streets and stepped off the track. The British team was disqualified, but the members of British Athletic Federation appealed this decision by accusing Rafal Omelko (Polish athlete) of  pushing Buck out of his line.

The British team was eventually reinstated as victors; the Polish squad of Michał Pietrzak, Rafal Omelko, Łukasz Domagała and Grzegorz Sobinskilost lost their third-place finish.

References

4 × 400 metres relay at the European Athletics Indoor Championships
2013 European Athletics Indoor Championships